Javagal  is a village in the southern state of Karnataka, India. It is located in the Arsikere taluk of Hassan district in Karnataka.  The Lakshminarasimha temple, built in 1250 A.D., is an important Hoysala architectural show piece in this town.

Demographics
As of 2001 India census, Javagal had a population of 7504 with 3809 males and 3695 females.

Notable people

Javagal Srinath (born 1969) former Indian cricketer, currently an ICC match referee

See also
 Hassan 
Banavara
 Districts of Karnataka

References

External links
 http://Hassan.nic.in/

Villages in Hassan district